Oligodon russelius, commonly known as Russell's kukri snake is a species of snake in the family Colubridae. The species is very closely related to Oligodon arnensis, from which it has been recently separated. The specific epithet honours the British herpetologist Patrick Russell, one of whose illustrations possibly depicts this species.

Taxonomy
The species was recognised as a distinct species in 2022 after a morphological and biogeographical evaluation of the Oligodon arnensis species complex. The populations of Oligodon arnensis (sensu lato) in the northern regions of India has now been assigned as Oligodon russelius (sensu stricto), distinguished from the southern population, which remains Oligodon arnensis.

Ecology

Distribution 
Nepal, Northern India, North-East Pakistan, and possibly parts of Bangladesh.

Feeding
It primarily feeds on eggs, and small lizards.

Reproduction
The snake is oviparous, like other colubrids. The clutch contains four or five remarkably elongate eggs with measured dimensions 36x3x10 mm and the SVLs of the hatchlings are around 181.0–193.0 mm. The hatchlings are usually brighter in colors with faded and less prominent cross stripes, but with distinct white margins. The juveniles have been mostly observed in April to July and during the winter.

Conservation
The species is of common occurrence and has a widespread range. The risk of extinction is regarded as low. The snakes often get killed by humans, particularly because of misidentification as kraits, due to the presence of bands. It is also often reported as road kills.

References

External links
 Oligodon russelius at Reptile-database
 Observations on iNaturalist

 Snakes of India
Reptiles described in 1803
russelius